Lamanva is a village near Budock Water in Cornwall, England. Residents of the village are included in the general population of Cornwall.

References

Villages in Cornwall